The Bosnia Vilayet was a first-level administrative division (vilayet) of the Ottoman Empire, mostly comprising the territory of the present-day state of Bosnia and Herzegovina, with minor parts of modern Montenegro. It bordered Kosovo Vilayet to the south. Before the administrative reform in 1867, it was called the Bosnia Eyalet.

It effectively ceased to exist as an Ottoman province after the Austro-Hungarian campaign in Bosnia and Herzegovina in 1878, although it formally existed for thirty more years until 1908, despite being governed by Austria-Hungary. This excluded Old Herzegovina, which was ceded to the Principality of Montenegro in 1878. In 1908, during the Bosnian Crisis, Austria-Hungary formally annexed it into its own territory.

Administrative divisions
Sanjaks of the Vilayet:
 Sanjak of Bosnia (Kazas of Visoka, Foyniça, Çayniça, Vişegrad, Çelebipazar and Kladine)
 Sanjak of Izvornik (Its center was Tuzla, kazas of Maglay, Gradçaniça, Gradaçaç, Breçka, Bjelina, İzvornik and Birçe)
 Sanjak of Banaluka (Kazas of  Gradişka, Derbend and Teşene)
 Sanjak of Hersek (Its center was Mostar, kazas of Foça, Koniça, Dumna, Liyubuşka, İstolça, Trebin, Bileke, Nikşik and Gaçka)
 Sanjak of Travnik (Kazas of Yayçe, Akhisar, Glamoç and İhlivne)
 Sanjak of Bihke (Kazas of Klyuç, Novosel, Sazın, Krupa, Kostayniça and Priyedor)

Languages
Bosnian language was used as the second official language of this vilayet.

See also

 List of Ottoman governors of Bosnia
 Ottoman Bosnia and Herzegovina
 Pashaluk of Herzegovina
 Sanjak of Novi Pazar

References 

 Markus Koller and Kemal H. Karpat, Ottoman Bosnia: A History in Peril, University of Wisconsin Press (2004)  
 Matija Mazuranic, A Glance into Ottoman Bosnia, Saqi Books (2007)

External links
 

Vilayets of the Ottoman Empire in Europe
Vilayet
Ottoman period in the history of Croatia
Ottoman period in the history of Montenegro
Ottoman Serbia
Vilayet
Vilayet
Vilayet
Vilayet
Vilayet
1867 establishments in the Ottoman Empire
1908 disestablishments in the Ottoman Empire
1867 establishments in Europe
1908 disestablishments in Europe
1880s in Bosnia and Herzegovina
Former subdivisions of Bosnia and Herzegovina during Ottoman period